Sejong is a constituency of the National Assembly of South Korea. The constituency consists of Sejong City (citywide). As of 2016, 167,748 eligible voters were registered in the constituency. In the 2020 South Korean legislative election, it was separated into Sejong City A and Sejong B.

List of members of the National Assembly

Election results

2016

2012

References 

Constituencies of the National Assembly (South Korea)